Tetracamphilius notatus is a species of loach catfish found in the Congo River Basin in the Central African Republic and the Democratic Republic of the Congo.  It reaches a length of 3.3 cm and has non-serrate pectoral fin spines, spots instead of bands on the body, and an olfactory organ that is not greatly enlarged. It is a freshwater fish with a tropical climate.

References 

 

Amphiliidae
Fish of Africa
Fish described in 1917
Taxa named by John Treadwell Nichols
Taxa named by Ludlow Griscom